The National Oceanographic Data Centre (NODC) is a national institute in Cameroon which compiles, analyses and monitors data related to the waters of Cameroon. The institute is a member of the International Oceanographic Data and Information Exchange System (IODE).and was established on February 28, 2001. The project is hosted by the Institute of Agricultural Research for Development (IRAD) which is under the Ministry of Scientific Research and Innovation (MINRESI).

External links
Official site

Oceanographic organizations
Organizations based in Cameroon
Organizations established in 2001
2001 establishments in Cameroon